is a Japanese former swimmer. He competed at the 1964 Summer Olympics and the 1968 Summer Olympics.

References

External links
 

1947 births
Living people
Japanese male freestyle swimmers
Olympic swimmers of Japan
Swimmers at the 1964 Summer Olympics
Swimmers at the 1968 Summer Olympics
Sportspeople from Hiroshima
Universiade medalists in swimming
Universiade bronze medalists for Japan
Medalists at the 1967 Summer Universiade
20th-century Japanese people